What Comes Next may refer to:

 What Comes Next, a psychological thriller book by John Katzenbach
 What Comes Next (album), by Cosmo's Midnight, 2018
 "What Comes Next", a song from the 2015 musical Hamilton
 "What Comes Next", a 1990 song by Yo La Tengo from the album Fakebook

Other uses
 Death and What Comes Next, a 2002 fantasy short story by Terry Pratchett

See also
 What Happens Next (disambiguation)